is a town located in Shiribeshi Subprefecture, Hokkaido, Japan.

As of September 2016, the town has an estimated population of 13,210. The total area is 70.64 km2.

History
Iwanai is one of the oldest towns in the region. Unlike many Hokkaido towns, it predates the Meiji Restoration, having started as a seasonal fishing location c. 1450, and developing into a year-round village in the mid-18th century. (Its official founding date is 1751). Citizens of Iwanai whose families have been native for many generations have a peculiar "fisherman" accent to their Japanese, distinct to others living in the region. (Most Hokkaido citizens speak Kantō, or Tokyo region, dialect; their ancestors emigrated from the Kantō region in the late 19th century).

Unfortunately, a massive fire in 1954 destroyed most of the traditional buildings, as they were mostly wooden structures. Modern Iwanai is much more Western in style, although there are still extensive Shinto shrines and Buddhist temples intact or rebuilt in the traditional fashion. The town also has a large shrine festival held every July.
1897: Iwanai Subprefecture was established.
1900: Iwanai Town became a First Class Town.
1910: Iwanai Subprefecture was abolished and Shiribeshi Subprefecture was established in Kutchan.
1954: A massive fire occurred.
1955: Iwanai Town was merged with Shimano Village to form the new town of Iwanai.
1985: Iwanai Line was abolished.

Geography
Iwanai is located on the western of the Shakotan Peninsula. A part of the town is in Niseko-Shakotan-Otaru Kaigan Quasi-National Park.

Neighboring towns
 Kyowa
 Rankoshi

Economics
Today Iwanai still has a heavy fishing industry, along with farming in the local region. It also has skiing in winter. Although the local slopes are rougher than those of nearby Kutchan, the bay is visible from the slopes. The town is also well known in the region for its sushi restaurants.

Education
 High school
 Hokkaido Iwanai High School
 Junior high school
 Iwanai Daiichi Junior High School
 Iwanai Daini Junior High School
 Elementary school
 Iwanai Nishi Elementary School
 Iwanai Higashi Elementary School

Culture

Mascot

His marks are "nejiri hachimaki" (a traditional Japanese headband), a "kuroi nagagutsu" (a black boot) and his mouth and always carries an asparagus as a weapon. His birthday is 9 August 1985. His siblings are  who is his twin sister and  who is his littler brother.

Sister cities
  Slavyanka, Primorsky Krai, Russia
  Fukaura, Aomori, Japan
  Jōetsu, Niigata, Japan

Notable people from Iwanai
Tetsuo Osawa, cyclist
Chikara Tanabe, wrestler
Ichiyamamoto Daiki, professional sumo wrestler

References

External links

Official Website 

Towns in Hokkaido